Comm100 Live Chat is a free basic live support software product offered via the SaaS (Software as a Service) model. It enables businesses or organizations to communicate with their website visitors in real time so as to improve conversions, sales and customer satisfaction.

History 

The first version of Comm100 Live Chat was released on August 5, 2009. In October 2011, Comm100 Live Chat was featured in Apps of the Month on TechRepublic by Scott Lowe.  The company hit the 200,000 registered business users mark in October, 2012. In January 2013, Comm100 Live Chat released version 7.0 which features Salesforce integration and a re-designed operator console. In the same month, Comm100 Live Chat was ranked top 3 in the "2013 Best Enterprise Chat Software" category on Top Ten Reviews. Zero downtime during the upgrade of Comm100 Live Chat was made possible in March, 2013.

Features 

Comm100 Live Chat consists of 3 parts: web chat window, operator console and control panel. All of them have a totally web-based version that works with all major web browsers (Chrome, IE, Firefox, Safari, Opera, etc.) on all major operating systems (Windows, Mac, Linux) while the operator console also has a cross-platform compatible desktop app and apps for mobile devices (iPhone, iPad, Android, BlackBerry).

Key features of Comm100 Live Chat include:

 Online chat: The website visitor and the operator can have an online chat in real time. 
 Website Traffic Monitoring: The operator can see detailed information about the website visitors, including GEO info, navigation history, referrer, etc.   
 Auto Chat Invitation Rules: Automated chat invitations can be sent to visitors in a personal way based on pre-defined rules. 
 Reports & Analytics: A series of performance reports are available for users to identify areas for improvement.

Integrations 

Comm100 Live Chat offers plugins or integrations with the following:
 Customer relationship management software: Salesforce.com
 Content management systems: WordPress, Joomla, Drupal
 E-commerce platforms: Shopify, Magento
 Help desk solutions: Zendesk
 Web analytics tools: Google Analytics

References 

Cloud applications